Vilalba dels Arcs (Villalba de los Arcos in Spanish) is a municipality in the comarca of Terra Alta in Catalonia, Spain.

This town is located in a wine-producing area. The area suffered much during the Battle of the Ebro. At the site known as Els Barrancs there are still almost intact trenches of the Spanish Republican line of defence, part of a long defensive line built between Vilalba dels Arcs and La Pobla de Massaluca.

References

External links 

Vilalba dels Arcs Town Hall - Official Site
 Government data pages 

Municipalities in Terra Alta (comarca)